Vegreville-Bruce was a provincial electoral district in Alberta mandated to return a single member to the Legislative Assembly of Alberta using the first past the post method of voting from 1963 to 1971.

History
Vegreville-Bruce is named for the Town of Vegreville, Alberta and the Hamlet of Bruce, Alberta.

Vegreville-Bruce was formed from Vegreville and Bruce electoral districts prior to the 1963 Alberta general election. Vegreville-Bruce would be abolished prior to the 1971 Alberta general election, returning to the Vegreville electoral district.

Members of the Legislative Assembly (MLAs)

Electoral history

1963 general election

1967 general election

See also
List of Alberta provincial electoral districts
Vegreville, Alberta, a town in eastern Alberta
Bruce, Alberta, a hamlet in eastern Alberta

References

Further reading

External links
Elections Alberta
The Legislative Assembly of Alberta

Former provincial electoral districts of Alberta